Christian Daniel Zenker (1766–1819) was a German entomologist who specialised in Coleoptera. He contributed species descriptions to Georg Wolfgang Franz Panzer's Faunae insectorum germanicae initia (Elements of the insect fauna of Germany). He was  Hofmarschall for the Kingdom of Saxony. His collection is held by the Staatliches Museum für Tierkunde, Dresden.

References
Walther Horn & Sigmund Schenkling: Index Litteraturae Entomologicae. Serie I: Die Welt-Literatur über die gesamte Entomologie bis inklusive 1863. Berlin 1928.

German entomologists
1766 births
1819 deaths